The neglected frog (Cophixalus neglectus) is a species of frog in the family Microhylidae. It is endemic to Australia. Its natural habitats are subtropical or tropical moist montane forests. It is threatened by habitat loss.

References

Cophixalus
Amphibians of Queensland
Taxonomy articles created by Polbot
Amphibians described in 1962
Frogs of Australia